Things Worth Fighting For is the debut album by solo artist John McKeown. The album was released digitally by Beatroute Records on the 28 September 2009.

The album was produced by Elliott Randall of Steely Dan fame.

Track listing
"Will You Be Mine"
"Can't Be Right"
"Touch You"
"Fade Away"
"Candy Girl"
"Dream on Valentine"
"Things Worth Fighting For"
"Up Where You Belong"
"Bleed"
"For You"

Album credits

 Produced by Elliott Randall and John McKeown
 Recorded at RAK Studios, London
 Strings & Horns recorded at SARM Studios, London
 String arrangements by Pete Murray
 Horn arrangement by Steve Sidwell
 Engineered by Wes Maebe
 Mixed by Elliott Randall & Wes Maebe
 Mastered by Wes Maebe at GHQ Sonic Cuisine
 Assisted by: Robbie Nelson & Tim Goalen

Session musicians
The following musicians performed on the album.

 Adam Phillips (Guitars)
 Arnulf Lindner (Bass)
 Reverend Bazil Meade (Backing Vocals)
 Elliott Randall (Guitars, Backing Vocals)
 Hugh Wilkinson (Percussion)
 Jenn Potter (Backing Vocals)
 Joshua Makhene (Backing Vocals)
 Luyanda Tezile (Backing Vocals)
 Hugh Wilkinson (Percussion)
 Pete Murray (Piano)
 Peter Zorn (Flute)
 Phebe Edwards (Backing Vocals)
 Pinse Saul (Backing Vocals)
 Ralph Salmins (Drums)
 Tshepo Rakobo (Backing Vocals)
 Zalika King (Backing Vocals)

References

2009 albums